Thomas Rhys Thomas (born 23 April 1982 in Abercynon, Wales) is a former Wales International rugby player. His usual position was at hooker. Thomas made a try-scoring debut for the Cardiff Blues against Celtic Warriors on 27 December 2003. He made his Wales debut against USA Eagles on 4 June 2005.

Thomas left London Wasps at the end of the 2012-13 season and joined Newport Gwent Dragons. He retired from playing at the end of the 2016-17 season to take up a coaching role at the Dragons.

References

External links
 Wales profile
 Dragons profile

1982 births
Living people
Cardiff Rugby players
Dragons RFC players
Rugby union hookers
Rugby union players from Abercynon
Wales international rugby union players
Welsh rugby union coaches
Welsh rugby union players
Wasps RFC players